The Ministry of Foreign Affairs and Immigration (MFAI) is a government ministry of Kiribati. The Minister is the President of Kiribati since its creation.

Ministers
Sir Ieremia Tabai (1979–1991)
Teatao Teannaki (1992–1994)
Teburoro Tito (1994–2003)
Anote Tong (2003–2016)
Taneti Maamau (2016–present)

See also
Foreign relations of Kiribati

External links
MFA

References

Government of Kiribati
Kiribati